Władysław Goral (1 May 1898 - February 1945) was auxiliary bishop of Lublin who was killed by the Nazis in Sachsenhausen concentration camp. He was beatified in 1999 as one of the 108 Blessed Polish Martyrs.

References 

1898 births
1945 deaths
108 Blessed Polish Martyrs
People who died in Sachsenhausen concentration camp